Uppaluru railway station (station code:UPL), is an Indian Railways station in Vijayawada city  of Andhra Pradesh. It lies on the Vijayawada–Nidadavolu loop line and is administered under Vijayawada railway division of South Coast Railway zone.

Classification 
Uppaluru railway station is categorized as a Non-Suburban Grade-6 (NSG-6) station in the Vijayawada railway division.

References 

Railway stations in Krishna district
Railway stations in Vijayawada railway division